Blind Guardian is a German power metal band formed in 1984 in Krefeld, West Germany. They are often credited as one of the seminal and most influential bands in the power metal and speed metal subgenres. Nine musicians have been a part of the band's line-up in its history, which has consisted of singer Hansi Kürsch, guitarists André Olbrich and Marcus Siepen, drummer Frederik Ehmke since 2005, and bassist Johan Van Stratum since 2021.

Blind Guardian is a part of the German heavy metal scene that emerged in the mid-1980s. The band was formed in 1984 as Lucifer's Heritage by Kürsch (then also bassist), Olbrich, other guitarist Markus Dörk and drummer Thomas Stauch. Dörk and Stauch both left the following year and were replaced by Christof Theißen and Hans-Peter Frey respectively, who left as well before the end of the year. In 1987, Siepen joined and Stauch returned; under this line-up, which lasted 18 years (the longest in the band's history), the band changed their name to Blind Guardian and released their first album, Battalions of Fear, in 1988. They have since released ten more studio albums, including an orchestral album that was released under the name Blind Guardian Twilight Orchestra.

Over the releases, Blind Guardian established themselves as a notable successful band and as pioneers of the power metal movement. In 1996, Kürsch stopped acting as the band's bassist to focus on vocals. Various session members replaced him, mainly Oliver Holzwarth. However, in 2005, Stauch left the band, disapproving of Blind Guardian's transition into a more complex progressive sound with a heavy use of backing vocals, and was replaced by Ehmke.

Most of Blind Guardian's albums were well received by fans and critics alike: Somewhere Far Beyond (1992), Imaginations from the Other Side (1995), and Nightfall in Middle-Earth (1998), are especially seen as influential works. The music is mostly composed by Kürsch and Olbrich together, and the lyrics, written by Kürsch, are mostly inspired by the fiction of fantasy authors such as J. R. R. Tolkien, Michael Moorcock, Stephen King, George R. R. Martin and Robert Jordan, as well as traditional legends and epics. Over the years a theme has developed which personifies the band members as travelling storytellers, leading fans to refer to the band affectionately as "The Bards". Blind Guardian has been referred to in one article as one of power metal "big four" bands, along with Helloween, Sabaton and DragonForce.

History

Formation as Lucifer's Heritage (1984–1987)
Blind Guardian was formed in 1984 in Krefeld, West Germany, by Hansi Kürsch (vocals, bass) and Andre Olbrich (guitar) under the name Lucifer's Heritage, with Markus Dörk (guitar) and Thomen Stauch (drums). The band briefly expanded into a quintet with the addition of a second lead vocalist, Thomas Kelleners. However, after three months Kelleners left the band in a mutual agreement. Lucifer's Heritage first released two demos in 1985 and 1986, despite undergoing chaotic lineup changes: Dörk and Stauch were replaced by Christof Theißen and Hans-Peter Frey, respectively. Finally, in 1987, Marcus Siepen joined and Thomen came back to form the lineup which would stay consistent for the next 18 years.

Name change and rise to success (1988–1996)
After Lucifer's Heritage signed a contract with No Remorse Records, the band changed their name to Blind Guardian to avoid any speculations about Satanism (in a bio it was stated that they also wanted to distance themselves from the black metal movement, as their demos were placed in with black metal albums at local record shops). The band's new name was inspired by the Fates Warning album Awaken the Guardian. They released their debut album Battalions of Fear in 1988, which was essentially a speed metal album heavily influenced by Helloween. These two German bands had close ties, and Helloween founder Kai Hansen made a guest appearance on Blind Guardian's second LP, Follow the Blind (1989), where the band revealed some thrash metal influence. Their third LP, Tales from the Twilight World (1990), had a much more melodic and "epic" feeling, with usage of choir and classical music influence.

Blind Guardian signed with Virgin Records in 1991 and released their fourth studio album Somewhere Far Beyond in 1992 and the live album Tokyo Tales in 1993. Flemming Rasmussen, former Metallica producer, began working with the band in 1994, producing their fifth studio album Imaginations from the Other Side, released in 1995, and The Forgotten Tales, an album that contained half covers and half original work, released in 1996.

Later years and departure of Thomen Stauch (1997–2009)

In 1998, Blind Guardian released their epic album Nightfall in Middle-Earth. "Complete with anthemic choruses, spoken word story lines, and plenty of bombastic power metal punctuating every dramatic turn", says Allmusic's Vincent Jeffries, "Nightfall in Middle-Earth is perhaps Blind Guardian's most triumphant". A concept album based on J. R. R. Tolkien's The Silmarillion, Blind Guardian's music demonstrated some folk rock influence, but also featured heavy use of Queen-style layered backing vocals. Since Nightfall, bass has been played by sessional member Oliver Holzwarth, and Hansi has been able to devote all his attention to singing. Nightfall was also the last Blind Guardian album produced by Rasmussen.

A Night at the Opera, named after the Queen album, was released four years later. On this album, the band's sound lacked almost all influence of their original speed metal. Power and progressive metal abound, with over the top orchestral backing and a consistent vocal and guitar layering throughout. Though not a true concept album, many of the lyrics dealt with the common themes of religion and relations between human and divine powers. It was followed by a live album in 2003 and a DVD, Imaginations Through the Looking Glass, in 2004, which was the last recorded Blind Guardian material to feature Thomen Stauch on drums. He left the band due to musical differences and was replaced by Frederik Ehmke. The first album with Ehmke was A Twist in the Myth, which came out in 2006.

Blind Guardian participated in the soundtrack for the In the Name of the King: a Dungeon Siege Tale fantasy movie (Uwe Boll), which came out in 2008. The band also recorded a theme song for Sacred 2 Fallen Angel role-playing video game, the sequel to Sacred.

At the Edge of Time and Beyond the Red Mirror (2010–2017)

"A Voice in the Dark" was the next single from Blind Guardian, released on 25 June 2010.
On 30 July 2010 the album followed, called At the Edge of Time. The band started "The Sacred Worlds and Songs Divine Tour 2010", the European dates featured the opening acts Enforcer and Steelwing.  The US dates had Holy Grail and Seven Kingdoms and later they were announced that they would play at Wacken Open Air in 2011.

On 21 July 2011, Hansi Kürsch announced on Blind Guardian's official website that they were working on an orchestral album. On 1 September 2011, Oliver Holzwarth joined Rhapsody of Fire as a full-time member, after 13 years as Blind Guardian's session bass player. On 27 January 2012, the band released a compilation album, titled Memories of a Time to Come, containing re-recorded and remixed songs from the band's entire discography, and almost exactly one year later, on 28 January 2013, they released a box set called A Traveler's Guide to Space and Time, which contained all of the bands' studio, live and compilation albums released from 1988 to 2004, as well as some previously unreleased material. On 11 July 2012 Hansi posted on the bands' official website that the band would cease touring after their show at the Rockharz festival in Ballenstedt, which happened two days after the post. Hansi went on in the post to explain that they wanted to really get down to work and focus on a new record before returning to the road once again in 2014 at the latest. He also mentioned that he really wanted to perform songs that they had never played live before when they return to touring.

In October 2013, the band were announced to be headlining the Out & Loud Festival in Geiselwind on 31 May 2014. On 18 October 2013 Hansi announced via a news post on the official website that he expected the new record to be fully produced and finished by May 2014. He mentioned that the production of the album was coming along well, and mentioned nine new songs by name (Irish Hill [now titled Grand Parade], Encrypted Time, Prophecies, Holy Grail, Winter's Coming, The Throne, The Ocean, and Outcast) and two other songs with presumably uncertain titles, Song 9 and Midtempo Song. The tenth Blind Guardian album, titled Beyond the Red Mirror, was released on 30 January 2015, its first single "Twilight of the Gods" having been released on 5 December 2014. On 28 January 2015, two days before the release of Beyond the Red Mirror, Blind Guardian announced on their official Facebook page that Barend Courbois is their new session/live bassist.

They recorded live shows during the 2015 European leg of the Beyond the Red Mirror tour for a new live album, Live Beyond the Spheres, which was released on 7 July 2017.

Legacy of the Dark Lands and The God Machine (2017–present) 
When asked in July 2017 about the next Blind Guardian studio album, Kürsch stated, "We haven't done too much songwriting for the next regular Blind Guardian album, but still, we've made some steps at least, and I can sense a strong change in comparison to what we did on the last album. There's one song called 'Architect of Doom', which is a real heavy song. Very powerful. Very thrashy at points. And there's another song called 'American Goth', which is kind of what you would expect from Blind Guardian, but yet the way we maintained the drums, for example, the way we maintained the orchestra, and that is a song with orchestra, again, it's so different. I'm pretty sure that there will be a significant change when you listen to these two albums and from that point of view, yes, Live Beyond the Spheres is the end of an era." He also stated that they are working on an orchestral album, which was originally scheduled to be finished and released in 2016, but now due for release in 2019, followed by a "heavy album" to be released in 2020.

The band's long-awaited orchestral album, Legacy of the Dark Lands, was released on 1 November 2019, after Olbrich and Kürsch conceiving and writing the project since 1996. It features only Kürsch as a performer, together with the Prague Philharmonic Orchestra, and as such is credited to the "Blind Guardian Twilight Orchestra" instead of the band's regular name.

It was revealed in November 2021 that a new single, "Deliver Us From Evil", would be released on 3 December 2021, and that the band's forthcoming twelfth album would be released in September 2022. Kürsch told Nuclear Blast, "We know that the gap between now and the album release in late 2022 is painfully long. Neither we nor our label could defy the current worldwide, economic crisis. A long story short: There is no one to blame for this situation... Talking about anticipation, even though "Violent Shadows" and "Deliver Us From Evil" are indisputably fantastic tracks, rest assured: We won't let you wait another ten months with only two songs. I promise you, that you will always been blown away - cheers to the digital era and its endless possibilities. Oh, and the album title. There is one but I won't tell you yet. This would be giving away far too much right now."

In July 2022, Jon Van Stratum replaced Barend Courbois as a session member. Despite persistent belief by some fans that he became a permanent regular member, it has been confirmed by Hansi Kürsch that he is only a live session member.

In May 2022, the title of the band's twelfth album was announced as The God Machine, along with a release date of 2 September 2022.

Musical style

The musical style of Blind guardian has been described as Power metal, symphonic metal, progressive metal, speed metal, thrash metal, epic power metal, heavy metal, neoclassical metal

Blind Guardian's first two albums, Battalions of Fear and Follow the Blind, were more in the style of speed metal than their following works. Beginning with their third album Tales from the Twilight World, Blind Guardian gradually began to write more complicated compositions focusing less on speed. As of their sixth album, Nightfall in Middle Earth, Hansi stopped playing bass to focus on singing. At this point the band began to incorporate large amounts of orchestral arrangements, and utilized the technique of overdubbing, heavily influenced by the English rock band Queen.

Blind Guardian's music features the staccato guitars and double bass drumming characteristic of power metal, as well as the use of overdubs and numerous backing vocals to create a dense sound. This proved significant on all albums after the first two but most particularly on A Night at the Opera.

Another definitive feature of Blind Guardian music is frequent use of folk tunes and instruments, especially in power ballads such as "Lord of the Rings", "The Bard's Song", "A Past and Future Secret", "Skalds and Shadows" and "Curse My Name", among others.

Influences
The band was initially inspired by their countrymen Helloween, and in its early releases also showed some influence from Iron Maiden and Metallica. According to guitarist Marcus Siepen, during the songwriting for Follow the Blind, they also used to listen to Bay Area thrash metal bands, such as Testament and Forbidden, resulting in a somewhat heavier sound.

Starting with their third album, Tales from the Twilight World, through Somewhere Far Beyond and Imaginations from the Other Side, Blind Guardian gradually incorporated more influences from progressive and classical music. Queen became a huge impact, in particular concerning the choir arrangements and harmonies, an effect most notable on A Night at the Opera.

Singer Hansi Kürsch expressed the band's attraction to 1970s progressive rock, for example early Genesis, Gentle Giant, and ELP. However, with regard to the genre, he sees the more direct influences in progressive metal bands, in particular Fates Warning, Queensrÿche, and Savatage. The folklorist influences on Nightfall in Middle-Earth came mainly from British rock band Jethro Tull.

Side projects
Along with Jon Schaffer, the leader and founder of Iced Earth, Kürsch was a member of Demons & Wizards, where he was the lead singer until its disbandment in early 2021.

Frederik Ehmke was a founding member of the band Sinbreed, in which Marcus Siepen was a session member. Later on, during 2012, Marcus became a full member of the band.

After the tsunami that struck Japan on 11 March 2011, Blind Guardian worked with their former record company, EMI Music, and auctioned off an exclusive studio session for two in the Twilight Hall Studio in Grefrath, Germany for charity. All of the proceeds were donated to the tsunami relief efforts. The auction ended on 22 April 2011 with a final bid of £1,171.00.

Band members

Current members
 Hansi Kürsch – lead vocals (1984, 1984–present), bass (1984–1996)
 André Olbrich – lead guitar, backing vocals (1984–present)
 Marcus Siepen – rhythm guitar, backing vocals (1987–present)
 Frederik Ehmke – drums, percussion, flute, bagpipes (2005–present)

Former members
 Thomas Kelleners – lead vocals (1984)
 Markus Dörk – rhythm guitar (1984–1986)
 Christoph Theissen – rhythm guitar (1986)
 Hans-Peter Frey – drums, percussion (1986)
 Thomas "Thomen" Stauch – drums, percussion (1984–1986, 1987–2005)

Session members
 Thomas Hackmann – backing vocals (1990–present)
 Billy King – backing vocals (1992–present)
 Olaf Senkbeil – backing vocals (1997–present)
 Michael "Mi" Schüren – keyboards (1997–present)
 Matthias Ulmer – keyboards, piano (2007–present)
 Johan van Stratum – bass (2021–present)

Former session members
 Mathias Wiesner – keyboards (1989–2002), bass (1992-1993)
 Rolf Köhler – backing vocals (1990–2007; died 2007)
 Marc Zee – keyboards, backing vocals (1993)
 Oliver Holzwarth – bass (1997–2011)
 Alex Holzwarth – drums (2002–2003)
 Pat Bender - keyboards, sound effects (2002–2006)
 Barend Courbois – bass, backing vocals (2015–2020)

Timeline

Discography 

Battalions of Fear (1988)
Follow the Blind (1989)
Tales from the Twilight World (1990)
Somewhere Far Beyond (1992)
Imaginations from the Other Side (1995)
Nightfall in Middle-Earth (1998)
A Night at the Opera (2002)
A Twist in the Myth (2006)
At the Edge of Time (2010)
Beyond the Red Mirror (2015)
Legacy of the Dark Lands (2019)
The God Machine (2022)

References

External links

Official website

German speed metal musical groups
German power metal musical groups
Music based on Middle-earth
Musical groups established in 1984
Musical quartets
Virgin Records artists
Nuclear Blast artists
German progressive metal musical groups
1984 establishments in West Germany